Amen is the third studio album by Paula Cole. It is officially credited to "The Paula Cole Band." The album was stylistically a major departure from Cole's previous album, This Fire, and was met with mixed reviews. Commercially, the album failed to match the success of This Fire, peaking at #92 on the Billboard 200 chart, and selling 116,000 copies to date.

The album did, however, score a moderate Adult Top 40 radio format hit with "I Believe In Love", which peaked at #22. A remix made for dance clubs and rhythmic radio format peaked at #18 on the Hot Dance Music/Club Play, and also attained moderate airplay.

Track listing

Personnel 
 Jamshied Sharifi – arranger, orchestra and string quartet conductor
 Tony Levin – bass, electric upright bass, Chapman Stick
 Alfredo Hidrovo – bongos, shaker
 Jay Bellerose – drums, tambourine, snare [toy], shaker, hihat [additional]
 Kevin Barry – electric guitar [wah], acoustic guitar, e-bow, electric sitar guitar, baritone guitar, Moog guitar], Fillanoma guitar, mandolin, acoustic slide guitar 
 Paula Cole – electric piano [Rhodes], bass [Rhodes], synthesizer [Moog], piano, bass [Juno], electric guitar [low-tuned], Clavinet, [Wah] clarinet, finger snaps, vocals
 Susan Jolles – harp
 DJ Premier – scratches
 Greg Leisz – pedal steel guitar
 Tionne "T-Boz" Wattkins – backing vocals

References 

1999 albums
Paula Cole albums